Frédéric Boulanger (June 1777-?) was a French cellist and professor of singing at the Paris Conservatory. From Dresden, he was the winner of the first prize in cello at the Conservatory in 1797 and a Professor of cello, attached to the King's Chapel. He was the father of Ernest Boulanger, a composer of comic operas, husband to mezzo-soprano Marie-Julie Halligner of the Théâtre de l'Opéra-Comique and grandfather to Nadia Boulanger and Lili Boulanger. He left his family though when Ernest was a small child.

References

French classical cellists
Academic staff of the Conservatoire de Paris
1777 births
Musicians from Dresden
Year of death missing
German emigrants to France